Bernice Dahn (born 1965), is the former Minister of Health in the Republic of Liberia, heading the country's Ministry of Health and Social Welfare. Dahn replaced Walter Gwenigale in June 2015 after a contentious confirmation process. She previously held the position of Deputy Minister for Health Services and Chief Medical Officer for the Ministry of Health in Liberia. Dahn's nomination was held up over allegations of financial corruption stemming from an audit by the General Auditing Commission (GAC).

Education 
In 1999, Dahn received a Certificate of Competence from Regional Training of Trainers for Reproductive Health at Mauritius Institute of Health in Pamplemousses, Mauritius; followed by a Certificate on International Health from the School of Public Health & Community Medicine at University of Washington, and a Certificate on Health Management from the International Health Exchange and Cooperation Center at the Ministry of Health, Beijing in the People's Republic of China.

In  1987, Dahn earned a Bachelor of Science in Zoology from the University of Liberia. In 1996, Dahn earned a Doctor of Medicine from A. M. Dogliotti College of Medicine at University of Liberia in Monrovia, Liberia. Dahn then earned a Master of Public Health in Health Services with a focus on international health from the University of Washington in Seattle, Washington in 2005.

Professional career 
Dahn previously held positions as Reproductive Health Adviser at United Nations Population Fund for four years, Family Health Director at the Liberia Ministry of Health for three years and a year as the Director for Nutrition at the Liberia Ministry of Health.

Other activities
 Global Fund to Fight AIDS, Tuberculosis and Malaria, Alternate Member of the Board (representing the West and Central Africa group)

References 

Health ministers of Liberia
Women physicians
Liberian politicians
Living people
University of Washington School of Public Health alumni
University of Liberia alumni
1965 births